36 Medium Regiment  is an artillery regiment which is part of the Regiment of Artillery of the Indian Army.

History

Formation
36 (Maratha) Medium Regiment was raised as 7/5 Mahratta Light Infantry at Faizabad on October 10, 1940 under Lt Col AL Collingwood as a Maratha class unit. The Regiment underwent multiple conversions, namely -
 7/5 (?51) (Mahratta) Regiment of Indian Armoured Corps (September, 1942) - it was part of the 268th Indian Infantry Brigade
 8 (Mahratta) Anti-Tank Regiment (January, 1943) 
 36 (Mahratta) Para Anti-Tank Regiment (December, 1946) 
 36 (Maratha) Anti-Tank Regiment (March, 1948) 
 36 (Maratha) Heavy Mortar Regiment (April 1956)
 36 (Maratha) Light Regiment (April 1965)
 36 (Maratha) Heavy Mortar Regiment (October 1971), and
 36 (Maratha) Medium Regiment (August 1981).

Operations

Some of the major operations undertaken by the Regiment include:

World War II The Regiment was part of the XIV Army against the Japanese in the battles of Letse, Popa, Pyanbwe and Arakan.

Indo-Pakistani War of 1947–1948 The regiment was deployed in an anti-tank role on the Uri – Domel Road.

Sino-Indian War The regiment saw action in the Tsangdhar-Zimithang and the Tawang - Sela Sectors in NEFA. It lost 62 men (killed / missing in action) during this war.

Indo-Pak War (1965) The regiment was deployed in the Dera Baba Nanak and Amritsar sectors and participated in support of operations to occupy areas up to the Icchogil Canal. It also participated in the Battle of Dograi.
Indo-Pakistani War of 1971  The regiment had acquired the Tampella 160 mm mortar system and took part in operations in the  Shakargarh Bulge and Sialkot sectors.

The unit got its present Medium Regiment designation after it was equipped with the M-46 130 mm Field Gun in 1981 and subsequently to the 155 mm Bofors gun. The regiment has taken part in Operation Rakshak,  Operation Vijay, Operation Parakram, in the Siachen conflict and Operation Rhino (Assam).

See also
 List of artillery regiments of Indian Army

References

Artillery regiments of the Indian Army after 1947
Military units and formations established in 1940